Paul James Stenn, Jr. (born Stenko) (July 12, 1918 – August 2, 2003) was an American football offensive tackle in the National Football League for the New York Giants, Washington Redskins, Pittsburgh Steelers, and the Chicago Bears.  He attended Villanova University.

1918 births
2003 deaths
People from Columbia County, Pennsylvania
American football offensive tackles
Villanova Wildcats football players
New York Giants players
Washington Redskins players
Pittsburgh Steelers players
Chicago Bears players
Players of American football from Pennsylvania